The Forgotten Story is a 1945 historical novel by the British novel Winston Graham. In the late nineteenth century a barquentine crashes on the rocks of the Cornish coast.

Adaptations
Dylan Thomas was commissioned to write an adaptation of the story by Sydney Box of Gainsborough Pictures, but the studio was closed before the screenplay was ready for shooting and it never went into production. In 1983 it was adapted into a six part television series of the same title, starring Van Johnson and Angharad Rees.

References

Bibliography
Murphy, Bruce F. The Encyclopedia of Murder and Mystery. Springer, 1999.
 Spicer, Andrew. British Film Makers: Sydney Box. Manchester University Press, 2006.

1945 British novels
Novels by Winston Graham
British historical novels
Novels set in the 19th century
Novels set in Cornwall
British novels adapted into television shows
Ward, Lock & Co. books